Pleurotomella eurybrocha is a species of sea snail, a marine gastropod mollusk in the family Raphitomidae.

Description
The length of the shell attains 5.5 mm, its diameter 2.7 mm.

Distribution
This marine species occurs off the Azores and Southern Spain.

References

 Sturany R. (1896). Zoologische Ergebnisse VII. Mollusken I (Prosobranchier und Opisthobranchier; Scaphopoden; Lamellibranchier) gesammelt von S.M. Schiff "Pola" 1890-1894. Denkschriften der Kaiserlichen Akademie der Wissenschaften, Mathematische-Naturwissenschaftlischen Classe, 63: 1-36, pl.1-2
 Gofas, S.; Le Renard, J.; Bouchet, P. (2001). Mollusca. in: Costello, M.J. et al. (eds), European Register of Marine Species: a check-list of the marine species in Europe and a bibliography of guides to their identification. Patrimoines Naturels. 50: 180-213.
 Sysoev A.V. (2014). Deep-sea fauna of European seas: An annotated species check-list of benthic invertebrates living deeper than 2000 m in the seas bordering Europe. Gastropoda. Invertebrate Zoology. Vol.11. No.1: 134–155

External links
 Dautzenberg P. & Fischer H. (1896). Dragages effectués par l'Hirondelle et par la Princesse Alice 1888-1895. 1. Mollusques Gastéropodes. Mémoires de la Société Zoologique de France. 9: 395-498, pl. 15-22
 
  Serge GOFAS, Ángel A. LUQUE, Joan Daniel OLIVER,José TEMPLADO & Alberto SERRA (2021) - The Mollusca of Galicia Bank (NE Atlantic Ocean); European Journal of Taxonomy 785: 1–114
 Gastropods.com: Pleurotomella eurybrocha

eurybrocha
Gastropods described in 1896